Bill Horsman may refer to:
 Bill Horsman (footballer)
 Bill Horsman (canoeist)